Prudent may refer to:

Prudent (name)

Ships:
HMS Prudent, a Royal Navy third-rate ship of the line
USS Prudent (PG-96), a US Navy gunboat
French ship Prudent, a French third-rate ship of the line burned at the Siege of Louisbourg (1758) by the British

See also
List of people known as the Prudent
Prudence